Harthill is a civil parish in Cheshire West and Chester, England. It contains ten buildings that are recorded in the National Heritage List for England as designated listed buildings. One of these is listed at Grade II*, the middle grade, and the rest are at the lowest grade, Grade II. Apart from the village of Harthill, the parish is entirely rural. Other than an outlying cottage, all the listed buildings are in the village, and include cottages, the school, the church and associated structures.

Key

Buildings

See also
Listed buildings in Broxton
Listed buildings in Bickerton
Listed buildings in Burwardsley

References
Citations

Sources

Listed buildings in Cheshire West and Chester
Lists of listed buildings in Cheshire